The Museum of Southern History also known as the G. Howard Bryan Museum of Southern History is located in Jacksonville, Florida, Duval County, Florida. It is located at 4304 Herschel Street. The museum depicts lifestyles and culture from the antebellum South and includes a research library for genealogy.

References

External links
 

Museums in Jacksonville, Florida
History museums in Florida